Pertyug is a rural locality (a village) in Krasnopolyanskoye Rural Settlement, Nikolsky District, Vologda Oblast, Russia. The population was 9 as of 2002.

Geography 
Pertyug is located 32 km west of Nikolsk (the district's administrative centre) by road. Yelkhovetsky is the nearest rural locality.

References 

Rural localities in Nikolsky District, Vologda Oblast